Masumiyet is a Turkish psychological thriller and drama television series directed by Ömür Atay and written by Sırma Yanık and produced by Faruk Targut. It starred Hülya Avşar, Mehmet Aslantuğ, Deniz Çakır and İlayda Alişan as the leading characters. It premiered on 24 February 2021 and concluded on 24 May 2021 with a total of 13 episodes.

Plot
The life of Bahar (Deniz Çakır), who is married and has two children, changes when her 19-year-old daughter falls in love with the wrong man. The first love of her daughter Ela (İlayda Alişan) is not a university student her age but he is her father's 35-year-old boss, who is about to marry someone else. Bahar's efforts to save her daughter from this wrong relationship are inconclusive.

Cast 
 Hülya Avşar - Hale Ilgaz
 Mehmet Aslantuğ - Harun Orhun
 Deniz Çakır - Bahar Yüksel
 Tolga Güleç - Timur Yüksel
 İlayda Alişan - Ela Yüksel
 Serkay Tütüncü - İlker Ilgaz
 Deniz Işın - İrem Orhun Ilgaz
 Asena Tuğal - Banu Kaya
 Ertuğrul Postoğlu - İsmail Ilgaz
 Selen Uçer - Yelda Demirci
 Asena Keskinci - Hande Hancı
 Neslihan Arslan - Birce  
 Rüçhan Çalışkur - Gülizar Yüksel
 Alayça Öztürk - Neva Hancı
 Kimya Gökçe Aytaç - Asu Ilgaz
 Gizem Ergün - Emel Yüksel
 Ozan Kaya Oktu - Umut Demirci
 Adin Külçe - Mert Yüksel
 Almina Günaydın - Aleyna
 Sevgi Temel - Burçak
 Süreyya Güzel - Avukat Beril
 Ceren Erginsoy
 Sonat Tokuç - Cenk

Broadcast schedule

References

External links
 Fox's official site Masumiyet

2021 Turkish television series debuts
2021 Turkish television series endings
Turkish drama television series
Fox (Turkish TV channel) original programming